Season eighteen of Dancing with the Stars premiered on March 17, 2014, on the ABC network.

On May 20, 2014, Olympic ice dancer Meryl Davis and Maksim Chmerkovskiy were crowned the champions, while snowboarder Amy Purdy and Derek Hough finished in second place, and actress Candace Cameron Bure and Mark Ballas finished in third.

This season was also first to feature a new twist called "The Switch Up", which gave viewers the opportunity to vote and change up the celebrity/professional pairings for a week during the season. Each celebrity was required to perform with a new pro for one week.

Cast

Couples
The cast of twelve and their professional partners were revealed on March 4, 2014, on Good Morning America. Sasha Farber, previously a pro, returned to the dance troupe. Former troupe members Witney Carson and Henry Byalikov were elevated to professional status, and Maksim Chmerkovskiy also returned following a two-season hiatus. Jenna Johnson, from season ten of So You Think You Can Dance, and Artem Chigvintsev, a professional on the British version of the show, joined the dance troupe this season.

Host and judges 
Len Goodman, Carrie Ann Inaba and Bruno Tonioli returned as judges; Tom Bergeron returned as host, while Erin Andrews replaced Brooke Burke-Charvet as co-host. Bandleader Ray Chew replaced the Harold Wheeler orchestra and singers.

Beginning in week three, a celebrity guest judge joined the judges panel. As a result, couples could receive a top score of 40 for their dances. Good Morning America anchor Robin Roberts was the first celebrity guest judge on March 31. The final guest judge, Kenny Ortega, appeared on the week nine semifinals.

Scoring charts

Notes

 : This was the lowest score of the week.
 : This was the highest score of the week.
 :  This couple finished in first place.
 :  This couple finished in second place.
 :  This couple finished in third place.
 :  This couple withdrew from the competition.
 :  This couple was eliminated.

Highest and lowest scoring performances
The highest and lowest performances in each dance according to the judges' 30-point scale are as follows. Scores by guest judges are not counted.

Couples' highest and lowest scoring dances
Scores are based upon a potential 30-point maximum. Scores by guest judges are not counted.

Weekly scores
Individual judges' scores in the charts below (given in parentheses) are listed in this order from left to right: Carrie Ann Inaba, Len Goodman, Bruno Tonioli.

Week 1: First Dances
Couples are listed in the order they performed.

Week 2: Celebrity's Pick Night
Couples are listed in the order they performed. Two couples were eliminated at the end of the night. Diana Nyad and Henry Byalikov were eliminated before they had a chance to perform their cha-cha-cha, although they did perform in exhibition and received no scores from the judges.

Week 3: Most Memorable Year Night
Individual judges scores in the chart below (given in parentheses) are listed in this order from left to right: Carrie Ann Inaba, Len Goodman, Robin Roberts, Bruno Tonioli.

At the beginning of the show, it was announced that Billy Dee Williams had to withdraw from the competition due to a chronic back problem. Therefore, no one was eliminated at the end of the show. Couples are listed in the order they performed.

Week 4: Switch-Up Night
Individual judges scores in the chart below (given in parentheses) are listed in this order from left to right: Carrie Ann Inaba, Len Goodman, Julianne Hough, Bruno Tonioli.

The couples switched professional partners this week and learned a new dance style. Due to the nature of the week, no elimination took place at the end of the show. Couples are listed in the order they performed.

Week 5: Disney Night
Individual judges scores in the chart below (given in parentheses) are listed in this order from left to right: Carrie Ann Inaba, Len Goodman, Donny Osmond, Bruno Tonioli.

Couples performed one unlearned dance to a song from a Disney film. Couples are listed in the order they performed.

Week 6: Party Anthems Night
Individual judges scores in the chart below (given in parentheses) are listed in this order from left to right: Carrie Ann Inaba, Redfoo, Len Goodman, Bruno Tonioli.

Couples are listed in the order they performed.

Week 7: Latin Night
Individual judges scores in the chart below (given in parentheses) are listed in this order from left to right: Carrie Ann Inaba, Ricky Martin, Len Goodman, Bruno Tonioli.

Couples performed one unlearned dance style and one team dance. Due to an injury suffered by Amy Purdy after performing her rumba, Team Loca's dance was scored based on the rehearsal footage filmed prior to the live show. Couples are listed in the order they performed.

Week 8: Celebrity Dance Duels Night
Individual judges scores in the chart below (given in parentheses) are listed in this order from left to right: Carrie Ann Inaba, Len Goodman, Abby Lee Miller, Bruno Tonioli.

Although billed as "dance duels," the two celebrities in each pairing received the same score. During the routine, the celebrities were required to dance with each other for 20 seconds on the dance floor without their professional partners. Couples are listed in the order they performed.

Week 9: American Icons Night
Individual judges scores in the chart below (given in parentheses) are listed in this order from left to right: Carrie Ann Inaba, Len Goodman, Kenny Ortega, Bruno Tonioli.

The semifinalists performed two unlearned dances to songs by American music icons. The celebrities were also able to speak with people who they consider "icons". Couples are listed in the order they performed.

Week 10: Finals
The four finalists performed two dances on the first night: the first was a new routine using the same dance style the celebrities had performed in week four with their switch-up partners, but now with their regular pro partners, and the second was a freestyle dance. On the second night, the couples danced a fusion dance of two previously learned dance styles. Couples are listed in the order they performed.

Night 1

Night 2

Dance chart
The celebrities and professional partners danced one of these routines for each corresponding week:
 Week 1 (First Dances): One unlearned dance
 Week 2 (Celebrity's Pick Night): One unlearned dance 
 Week 3 (Most Memorable Year Night): One unlearned dance
 Week 4 (Switch-Up Night): One unlearned dance
 Week 5 (Disney Night): One unlearned dance
 Week 6 (Party Anthem Night): One unlearned dance
 Week 7 (Latin Night): One unlearned dance & team dances
 Week 8 (Celebrity Dance Duels Night): One unlearned dance & dance duel
 Week 9 (American Icons Night): Two unlearned dances
 Week 10 (Finals, Night 1): Judge's pick of "Partner Switch-Up Night" dances & freestyle
 Week 10 (Finals, Night 2): Fusion dance

Notes

 :  This was the highest scoring dance of the week.
 :  This was the lowest scoring dance of the week.
 :  This couple danced, but received no scores.

Ratings

Notes

References

External links

Dancing with the Stars (American TV series)
2014 American television seasons